The Canadian Imperial Bank of Commerce Building (or Édifice Canadian Imperial Bank of Commerce) is a building at 265 Saint-Jacques Street in Montreal, Quebec, Canada.

History

The building was built in 1906-1909.  The five-storey building was designed by Darling and Pearson in the Edwardian Baroque style and is fronted by a monumental hexastyle Corinthian portico carved from grey Stanstead granite from Stanstead in Quebec's Eastern Townships. 
The building was constructed as the main Montreal branch of the Canadian Bank of Commerce (which merged with the Imperial Bank of Canada in 1961 to form the Canadian Imperial Bank of Commerce). CIBC main offices in Montreal left the building in 1962 when the CIBC Tower was completed, but the built an active branch until it was sold in 2010.

In 2012, the owners of the Montreal landmark, The Rialto Theatre, purchased the former bank and crowned it The St. James Theatre. While staying true to the history of the building and highlighting its breathtaking architecture, the St. James Theatre is one of Montreal newest high-end venues for private events.

The building housed the Montreal offices of the White Star Line from 1909 to 1939.  It is where the tickets for the RMS Titanic were sold.

Prior to this, the site was occupied by the Temple Building from 1889 to 1890 and St. James Church from 1845 to 1888.

See also
Other banking offices in Montreal:

 Bank of Montreal Head Office, Montreal
 Old Royal Bank Building, Montreal
 Molson Bank Building, Montreal

Other CIBC offices in Canada:

 Commerce Court
 Tour CIBC
 Commerce Place I and Commerce Place II

References

 Images Montréal profile (with photos)
 Vieux-Montréal – Édifice Canadian Imperial Bank of Commerce (with photos)
 Canadian Architect and Builder, 22, 1 (1908): 30
 Communauté urbaine de Montréal. Service de la planification. Répertoire d'architecture traditionnelle sur le territoire de la communauté urbaine de Montréal : architecture commerciale [Vol.] I : les banques.  Montréal, Communauté urbaine de Montréal, Service de la planificatiom du territoire, 1980. xiii, 139p. ill., numerous photos and drawings.
 Lambert, Phyllis et Robert Lemire. Inventaire des bâtiments du Vieux-Montréal, du quartier Saint-Antoine et de la Ville de Maisonneuve construits entre 1880 et 1915.  Montréal, Min. des Affaires Culturelles, Centre de documentation, Serv. de l'Inventaire des biens culturels, juin 1977. 102 p. 6 plans.
 Le Prix courant, 40, 13, (1907): 41
 Construction (Toronto), 1, 8 (1908): 54-59

External links
 The Canadian Encyclopedia – Bank Architecture

Beaux-Arts architecture in Canada
Office buildings in Montreal
Canadian Imperial Bank of Commerce
Darling and Pearson buildings
Heritage buildings of Quebec
Historic bank buildings in Canada
Neoclassical architecture in Canada
Office buildings completed in 1909
Old Montreal
1909 establishments in Quebec